Elections to the North Dakota House of Representatives were held on November 3, 2020. A total of 46 seats out of 94 were up for re-election.

The primary election was held on June 9, 2020.

Predictions

Results

District 2

District 4

District 6

District 8

District 10

District 12

District 14

District 16

District 18

District 20

District 22

District 24

District 26

District 28

District 30

District 32

District 34

District 36

District 38

District 40

District 42

District 44

District 46

References

See also
 2020 North Dakota elections
 2020 North Dakota Senate election
 2020 United States state legislative elections

2020
North Dakota House
House